Augathella  is a rural town and locality in the Shire of Murweh, Queensland, Australia.

Geography 
The town lies on the banks of the Warrego River.

Grazing is still the predominant industry of the area.

History
Bidjara (also known as Bidyara, Pitjara, and Peechara) is an Australian Aboriginal language spoken by the Bidjara people. The Bidjara language region includes the local government areas of the Shire of Murweh, particularly the towns of Charleville, Augathella and Blackall as well as the properties of Nive Downs and Mount Tabor.

Gungabula (also known as Kongabula and Khungabula) is an Australian Aboriginal language of the headwaters of the Dawson River in Central Queensland. The language region includes areas within the local government area of Maranoa Region, particularly the towns of Charleville, Augathella and Blackall and as well as the Carnarvon Range.

Gunya (Kunya, Kunja, Kurnja) is an Australian Aboriginal language spoken by the Gunya people. The Gunya language region includes the landscape within the local government boundaries of the Paroo Shire Council, taking in Cunnamulla and extending north towards Augathella, east towards Bollon and west towards Thargomindah.

The town, built up gradually over what was Kunja tribal territory, came into being initially as a resting place for bullock teams lying at the convergence of three bullock tracks from Morven, Tambo, and Charleville. Originally called Burenda it was renamed Ellangowan (still the name of the local watering hole) and when gazetted in 1883 called Augathella. This is apparently an Indigenous Australian word meaning "camp on a waterhole", referring the Warrego River. A service centre sprang up to service their needs and the needs of the burgeoning grazing industry.

Burenda Post Office opened on 1 September 1869. It was renamed Ellangowan in 1877 and Augathella in 1883.

Augathella Provisional School opened on 1 January 1884. On 7 August 1893 it became Augathella State School.

On Sunday 10 July 1892 St Luke's Anglican church was officially opened by Bishop Nathaniel Dawes. A new church was built at a cost of £8300 and dedicated in 1957.

On 1 October 1928 Rev W.C. Radcliffe officially opened the Augathella Presbyterian Church.

The 1956 film Smiley was based on Moore Raymond's novel of the same name, which was set in a fictionalised version of Augathella.

The town's service centre was bypassed by the new Matilda Highway during the 1980s. Some new businesses have slowly encroached back onto the highway frontage.

Augathella and the surrounding district suffered extensive flood damage in 1990 when the Warrego River burst its banks and flooded the town.

The Augathella Library opened in 2000.

Heritage listings 
There are a number of heritage-listed sites in Augathella, including:

Within the town:

 Annie Street: Catholic Church
 Annie Street: Catholic School
 Cavanagh Street: Hospital
 Cavanagh Street: Queensland Country Women's Association
 Elmes Street: Rodeo Grounds
 Forest Street: Augathella Water Tower
 Jane Street (corner of Cavanagh Street): Kenniff Tree
 Main Street: Arts and Craft Centre (former Helton's Building)
 Main Street: Butcher shop
 Main Street: Police station
 Main Street: Post office
 Main Street: Town hall
 Main Street: War Memorial Hill
 Main & Annie Streets: Ellangowan Hotel
 61 Main Street: St Luke's Anglican Church
 Nelson Street: Old Water Tower
 off Russell Street: Cemetery
 off West Street: Augathella Race Course
Within the locality:

 Carnarvon Station: Fig Tree Spring Stockyards
 Dooloogarah Carnarvon National Park Road: Ralph's Bore & Upper Warrego Police Barracks site
 Mount Tabor: Dingo Fence Section

Education 
Augathella State School is a government primary (Early Childhood-6) school for boys and girls at Cavanagh Street. In 2018, the school had an enrolment of 44 students with 4 teachers and 4 non-teaching staff (3 full-time equivalent). Augathella State School is part of Education Queensland's Charleville Cluster and is supported by the Darling Downs South West regional team which is based in Toowoomba.

There is no secondary school in Augathella. School Bus Route S279 conveys students from Year 7 to Year 12 into Charleville to attend Charleville State High School.

Amenities 
The Murweh Shire Council operates the Augathella Library on Main Street, Augathella. The Augathella Library has a high-speed Internet Connection (powered by the National Broadband Network)

The Augathella branch of the Queensland Country Women's Association has its rooms at 101 Cavanagh Street.

St Luke's Anglican Church is at 61 Main Street and holds services on the 2nd Sunday of each month.

There is a growing arts centre in the town, public swimming pool, a bowls club, and polocrosse teams.

Events 
There is an annual rodeo.

There is also a Christmas Celebration in Meat Ant Park every December

Media 
Augathella is serviced by:

 Radio 4VL (Resonate Radio) - 106.1 FM

The Australian Broadcasting Corporation transmits ABC Television and its sister channels ABC Kids/ABC TV Plus, ABC Me and ABC News to Augathella through its relay station, ABAAQ at 25°48′23″S 146°35′21″E (old Charleville - Augathella Road)

The Seven Network and its sister stations 7two and 7mate transmit to Augathella through its regional area affiliate, ITQ

The Nine Network and its sister channels 9Gem, 9Go! and transmit to Augathella through its regional area affiliate, Imparja Television

Network Ten and its sister channels 10 Bold, 10 Peach and transmit to Augathella through its regional area affiliate, CDT

The Special Broadcasting Service and its sister channels SBS Viceland, SBS World Movies and SBS Food also transmit to Augathella

Attractions 
Augathella is the permanent home of the Q150 Shed that travelled around the state in 2009 as part of the Q150 Celebrations providing each community it visited a night of entertainment. Communities toured included: Mount Isa, Cairns, Townsville, Mackay, Rockhampton, Maryborough, Blackall, Augathella, Cherbourg, Warwick, Brisbane and the Gold Coast.

Transport 
Augathella is situated on the junction of the Landsborough Highway from Morven and the Mitchell Highway from Charleville. Augathella is served by Greyhound Australia who operates Gx493 between Brisbane and Mount Isa and its return service, Gx494 which stops at the BP Roadhouse on the Highway

Augathella Aerodrome has a sealed runway, . It is operated by Murweh Shire Council.

In popular culture
Augathella is the destination of cattle drovers in the Australian folk song Brisbane Ladies. This song is alternately called "Augathella Station".

References

External links

 University of Queensland: Queensland Places: Augathella

Towns in Queensland
South West Queensland
Shire of Murweh
Localities in Queensland